The Azadi Basketball Arena is an all-seater indoor arena located in Tehran, Iran. It is a part of 5 Halls Complex within the Azadi Sport Complex. It seats 3,000 people.

Hosted events
Basketball at the 1974 Asian Games
2002 WABA Championship
2003 WABA Champions Cup
2004 WABA Championship
2004 FIBA Asia Under-20 Championship
2007 FIBA Asia Champions Cup
2008 FIBA Asia Under-18 Championship
2010 WABA Champions Cup
2013 WABA Championship
2013 FIBA Asia Under-16 Championship
2014 WABA Champions Cup
2016 FIBA Asia Under-18 Championship
2016 FIBA Asia Challenge (only one matchday)
2022 FIBA U18 Asian Championship

External links
Page on Azadi Sport Complex Official Website

Indoor arenas in Iran
Sports venues in Tehran
Basketball venues in Iran
Sports venues completed in 1971
1971 establishments in Iran
Asian Games basketball venues